Lucky Strike is a brand of American cigarettes.

Lucky Strike may also refer to:

Entertainment and media
 "Lucky Strike" (CSI), an episode of the television show CSI
 A Lucky Strike, a 1915 film featuring Oliver Hardy
 "Lucky Strike", an episode of the TV show 90210
 "Lucky Strike", an episode of the British sitcom Oh, Doctor Beeching!
 "Lucky Strike" (Maroon 5 song), from the 2012 album Overexposed
 "Lucky Strike", a 2018 song by the singer Troye Sivan from his album Bloom
 Lucky Strikes (album), a 1964 album by jazz saxophonist Lucky Thompson
 The Lucky Strike, a World War II alternate history novella by Kim Stanley Robinson

Places
 Lucky Strike, Alberta, a town in Alberta
 Lucky Strike, Belize, a village located in the Belize District
 Lucky Strike, in the Mid Atlantic Ridge, where Luckia striki was discovered

Other uses
 Lucky Strike Lanes, a chain of bowling lanes
 Camp Lucky Strike, a World War II rehabilitation camp; see Stalag Luft I